Maungawhau / Mount Eden is a scoria cone and Tūpuna Maunga (ancestral mountain) in the Mount Eden suburb of Auckland, New Zealand.

Geography
The volcano erupted from three craters 28,000 years ago, with the last eruptions from the southern crater filling the northern craters. The western face of the hill was extensively quarried. This is the site of a large ecological restoration project run by volunteers.

Naming
Maungawhau is a Māori-language name meaning 'mountain of the whau tree'. The name "Mount Eden" was chosen by Governor William Hobson, to honour George Eden, 1st Earl of Auckland, who was his superior naval officer. The crater is named Te Upu Kai a Mataaho ('the bowl of Mataaho'); Mataaho was a deity said to live in the crater and to be the guardian of the secrets hidden in the earth.

Treaty settlement

In the 2014 Treaty of Waitangi settlement between the Crown and the Ngā Mana Whenua o Tāmaki Makaurau collective of 13 Auckland iwi and hapu (also known as the Tāmaki Collective), ownership of the 14 Tūpuna Maunga of Tāmaki Makaurau / Auckland, was vested to the collective, including the volcano officially named Maungawhau / Mount Eden. The legislation specified that the land be held in trust "for the common benefit of Ngā Mana Whenua o Tāmaki Makaurau and the other people of Auckland". The Tūpuna Maunga o Tāmaki Makaurau Authority or Tūpuna Maunga Authority (TMA) is the co-governance organisation established to administer the 14 Tūpuna Maunga. Auckland Council manages the Tūpuna Maunga under the direction of the TMA.

Tourism and access 
Maungawhau / Mount Eden attracts many tourists, as it is the highest natural point in Auckland, and provides good views in all directions over the city.

In 2019, the 1926 Spanish Mission-style tearoom was converted into Whau Cafe and the Te Ipu Kōrero o Maungawhau / Mount Eden Visitor Experience Centre. The centre showcases the geological and Māori cultural history of the maunga. 

In 2020, boardwalks were opened around the crater rim, to protect the pā tūāpapa (terraces) and rua kūmara (kūmara storage pits) on the summit's upper slopes. Views from the boardwalk into the deep crater and over Auckland city are spectacular.

Other uses
In the early 20th Century, stone was quarried by Mount Eden Prison inmates from Maungawhau / Mount Eden for use in road projects.

From the 1950s the peak was used by the New Zealand Post Office for VHF radio communications in two buildings, several hundred metres apart, each with their own antenna farm. One building housed transmitting equipment, while the other housed receiving equipment. In the 1960s the site was staffed during the five-day working week due to the large number of valves that wore out under the stress of high power and needed frequent servicing. Typical use of the facility was for businesses e.g. taxi or delivery firms needing mobile communications to vehicles.

An underground water reservoir has been located on the northern side of Maungawhau / Mount Eden since the 1870s. The original reservoir was replaced in 1912, and a second, complementary, reservoir added in 1930. The reservoirs, recently upgraded to meet growing demand, work together to supply the Mount Eden, Epsom, One Tree Hill and Khyber Pass Road areas.

The trig station at the summit was used as a reference point for drawing up Auckland's suburbs. The platform was built with help from Prince Alfred's elephant. The elephant was rewarded with lollies, buns and beer.

References

Volcanoes of Auckland: A Field Guide. Hayward, B.W.; Auckland University Press, 2019, 335 pp. .

External links
 Pronunciation
 Friends of Maungawhau website
 Photographs of Maungawhau held in Auckland Libraries' heritage collections.

Auckland volcanic field
Parks in Auckland
Tourist attractions in Auckland
Lookouts in Auckland
Mountains of the Auckland Region
Urban forests in New Zealand